Anton Rosén (born 21 August 1991) is a Swedish motorcycle speedway rider who rides in Swedish Elitserien for Västervik.

In 2009 he qualified for the 2009 Individual U-19 European Championship Final. Three days before the Final, he was injured in the Elitserien match between Västervik and Vargarna.

Career details

European Championships 

 Individual U-19 European Championship
 2009 -  Tarnów - injury before the Final and was replaced
 2010 - 13th placed in the Semi-Final Three
 Team U-19 European Championship
 2009 -  Holsted - Runner-up (6 pts)
 2010 -  Divišov - Runner-up (12 pts)

See also 
 Sweden national speedway team
 Speedway in Sweden

References 

Swedish speedway riders
1991 births
Living people